Notiasemus is a monotypic genus of centipedes in the Scolopendridae family. Its sole species is Notiasemus glauerti. It is endemic to Australia, and was first described in 1985 by L. E. Koch.

Distribution
The species occurs in south-west Western Australia.

Behaviour
The centipedes are solitary terrestrial predators that inhabit plant litter, soil and rotting wood.

References

 

 
Scolopendridae
Monotypic arthropod genera
Centipede genera
Centipedes of Australia
Endemic fauna of Australia
Fauna of Western Australia
Animals described in 1985